The year 2011 is the 11th year in the history of Deep, a mixed martial arts promotion based in Japan. In 2011 Deep held 31 events beginning with, Deep: Shizuoka Impact 2011.

Title fights

Events list

Deep: Shizuoka Impact 2011

Deep: Shizuoka Impact 2011 was an event held on February 6, 2011, at Twin Messe in Shizuoka.

Results

Deep: clubDeep Nagoya: Kobudo Fight 2

Deep: clubDeep Nagoya: Kobudo Fight 2 was an event held on February 13, 2011, at Asunal Kanayama Hall in Nagoya.

Results

Deep: 52 Impact

Deep: 52 Impact was an event held on January 24, 2011, at Korakuen Hall in Tokyo.

Results

Deep: Tokyo Impact

Deep: Tokyo Impact was an event held on February 27, 2011, at Shinjuku Face in Tokyo.

Results

Deep: Annihilate!

Deep: Annihilate! was an event held on March 13, 2011, at Shibuya Ax in Tokyo.

Deep: 53 Impact

Deep: 53 Impact was an event held on April 22, 2011, at Korakuen Hall in Tokyo.

Results

Deep: clubDeep in Diana

Deep: clubDeep in Diana was an event held on April 24, 2011, at Club Diana in Tokyo.

Results

Deep / Smash: Japan MMA League 2011: Raising an Army

Deep / Smash: Japan MMA League 2011: Raising an Army was an event held on May 7, 2011, at Shinkiba 1st Ring in Tokyo.

Results

Deep: Kobudo Fight Future Challenge 10

Deep: Kobudo Fight Future Challenge 10 was an event held on May 22, 2011, at Kobudo Martial Arts Communication Space, Tiger Hall in Nagoya.

Results

Deep: Tokyo Impact 2

Deep: Tokyo Impact 2 was an event held on June 5, 2011, at Shinjuku Face in Tokyo.

Results

Deep / Smash: Japan MMA League 2011 vol. 2

Deep / Smash: Japan MMA League 2011 vol. 2 was an event held on June 18, 2011, at Shinkiba 1st Ring in Tokyo.

Results

Deep: 54 Impact

Deep: 54 Impact was an event held on June 24, 2011, at Korakuen Hall in Tokyo.

Results

Deep / Smash: Japan MMA League 2011 vol. 3

Deep / Smash: Japan MMA League 2011 vol. 3 was an event held on July 2, 2011, at Shinkiba 1st Ring in Tokyo.

Results

Deep: Cage Impact 2011 in Nagoya

Deep: Cage Impact 2011 in Nagoya was an event held on July 10, 2011, at Zepp Nagoya in Nagoya.

Results

Deep: clubDeep Toyama: Rookies and Oyaji Deep

Deep: clubDeep Toyama: Rookies and Oyaji Deep was an event held on August 7, 2011, at Toyama Event Plaza in Toyama.

Results

Deep: Beach Fight: Mach Festival

Deep: Beach Fight: Mach Festival was an event held on August 13, 2011, in Ichinomiya.

Deep / Smash: Japan MMA League 2011 vol. 4

Deep / Smash: Japan MMA League 2011 vol. 4 was an event held on August 20, 2011, at Shinkiba 1st Ring in Tokyo.

Results

Deep: clubDeep in Diana 2

Deep: clubDeep in Diana 2 was an event held on August 21, 2011, at Club Diana in Tokyo.

Results

Deep: 55 Impact

Deep: 55 Impact was an event held on August 26, 2011, at Korakuen Hall in Tokyo.

Results

Deep / Smash: Japan MMA League 2011 vol. 5

Deep / Smash: Japan MMA League 2011 vol. 5 was an event held on September 3, 2011, at Shinkiba 1st Ring in Tokyo.

Results

Deep: Osaka Impact

Deep: Osaka Impact was an event held on September 4, 2011, at Matsushita IMP Hall in Osaka.

Results

Deep: Cage Impact 2011 in Hamamatsu

Deep: Cage Impact 2011 in Hamamatsu was an event held on September 18, 2011, at Act City in Hamamatsu.

Results

Deep / Smash: Japan MMA League 2011 vol. 6

Deep / Smash: Japan MMA League 2011 vol. 6 was an event held on October 8, 2011, at Shinkiba 1st Ring in Tokyo.

Results

Deep: clubDeep Nagoya: Kobudo Fight 3

Deep: clubDeep Nagoya: Kobudo Fight 3 was an event held on October 9, 2011, at Asunal Kanayama Hall in Nagoya.

Results

Deep: Cage Impact 2011 in Tokyo, 1st Round

Deep: Cage Impact 2011 in Tokyo, 1st Round was an event held on October 29, 2011, at Differ Ariake in Tokyo.

Results

Deep: Cage Impact 2011 in Tokyo, 2nd Round

Deep: Cage Impact 2011 in Tokyo, 2nd Round was an event held on October 29, 2011, at Differ Ariake in Tokyo.

Results

Deep: Cage Impact 2011 in Toyama

Deep: Cage Impact 2011 in Toyama was an event held on November 27, 2011, at Toyama Event Plaza in Toyama.

Results

Deep: Future King Tournament 2011

Deep: Future King Tournament 2011 was an event held on December 10, 2011, at Shinkiba 1st Ring in Tokyo.

Results

Deep: 56 Impact

Deep: 56 Impact was an event held on December 16, 2011, at Korakuen Hall in Tokyo.

Results

Deep / Smash: Japan MMA League 2011 Semifinals

Deep / Smash: Japan MMA League 2011 Semifinals was an event held on December 17, 2011, at Shinjuku Face in Tokyo.

Results

Deep: Oyaji Deep

Deep: Oyaji Deep was an event held on December 18, 2011, at Asunal Kanayama Hall in Nagoya.

Results

See also 
 List of Deep champions
 List of Deep events

References

Deep (mixed martial arts) events
2011 in mixed martial arts